Mark Pryor (born May 8, 1967) is a British mystery writer and Assistant District Attorney for Travis County, Texas. He is best known for his mystery novels featuring Hugo Marston, a former FBI agent from Texas, and now head of security at the U.S. Embassy in Paris. Pryor is also the author of the nonfiction book, As She Lay Sleeping, based on the 1985 cold case murder of Natalie Antonetti (the mother of Johnny Goudie) that he successfully prosecuted in 2011.  He has appeared on CBS News' "48 Hours"  and Discovery Channel's "Discovery ID: Cold Blood" discussing the case. He is also the creator of the true-crime blog D.A. Confidential.

Biography
Pryor grew up in Hertfordshire, England.  He earned a journalism degree and became a police reporter for a paper in Colchester, Essex. In 1994, he  moved to Chapel Hill, North Carolina, where his mother is from and returned to school. He received a bachelor's degree from the University of North Carolina Chapel Hill journalism school in 1999 and a law degree from Duke University in 2002. After graduating, he moved to Dallas, Texas to practice civil law. In 2006, he moved to Austin, Texas to accept a position with the Travis County District Attorney’s Office. He currently resides in Austin with his wife and three children.

Publications

Hugo Marston Novels
The Bookseller (2012) Seventh Street Books 
The Crypt Thief (2013) Seventh Street Books 
The Blood Promise (2014) Seventh Street Books 
The Button Man (2014) Seventh Street Books 
The Reluctant Matador (2015) Seventh Street Books 
The Paris Librarian (2016) Seventh Street Books 
The Sorbonne Affair (2017) Seventh Street Books 
The Book Artist (2019) Seventh Street Books 
The French Widow (2020) Seventh Street Books

Standalone Novels
Hollow Man (2015) Seventh Street Books 
Dominic: A Hollow Man Novel (2018) Seventh Street Books

Nonfiction
Faith, Grace and Heresy: The Biography of Rev. Charles M. Jones (2002) Writer's Showcase Press 978-0-59521-718-2
As She Lay Sleeping (2013) New Horizon Press

References

External links
http://www.markpryorbooks.com/
http://www.daconfidential.com/
http://www.worldcat.org/identities/lccn-n2012032696/

1967 births
Living people
British mystery writers
21st-century American novelists
Texas lawyers
Novelists from Texas
University of North Carolina School of Law alumni
Duke University School of Law alumni
American male novelists
21st-century American male writers
UNC Hussman School of Journalism and Media alumni